Mohammed Faheem (born 17 May 1999) is a Sri Lankan cricketer. He made his Twenty20 debut on 10 January 2020, for Police Sports Club in the 2019–20 SLC Twenty20 Tournament. He made his first-class debut on 5 February 2020, for Police Sports Club in Tier B of the 2019–20 Premier League Tournament.

References

External links
 

1999 births
Living people
Sri Lankan cricketers
Sri Lanka Police Sports Club cricketers
Place of birth missing (living people)